Ruth Stephan (27 October 1925 – 8 August 1975) was a German film and stage actress. She appeared with Heinz Erhardt in the 'Willi' series of films.

Biography 
Ruth Stephan was born to retail merchant Kurt Stephan and his wife, Kriemhilde. After graduating from school, she first worked as a certified bank teller before taking acting lessons.

During her early acting career, she worked mostly on the stage in Germany, including theaters in Hamburg and Berlin. She appeared in her first movie in 1951, and subsequently became a popular figure in German comedy movies.

Most notably she appeared in numerous movies alongside Heinz Erhardt, often playing his wife or secretary. She also became popular for portraying an English and biology teacher in the late 1960s high school movie series Die Lümmel von der ersten Bank (English translation: The buggers from the first bench).

In the early 1970s Stephan went back to the stage. She died of lung cancer in August 1975. A street in the district of Berlin-Spandau is named after her.

Selected filmography

 Die Frauen des Herrn S. (1951) - Das Persönchen
 Homesick for You (1952)
 I Lost My Heart in Heidelberg (1952) - Dietlinde, Studentin
 You Only Live Once (1952) - Frl. Rosa
 The Uncle from America (1953) - Rosa, Dienstmädchen
 Not Afraid of Big Animals (1953) - Partnerin des Zauberkünstlers
 Lady's Choice (1953)
 The Empress of China (1953)
 Hit Parade (1953)
 The Private Secretary (1953) - Lissy
 The Abduction of the Sabine Women (1954) - Dienstmädchen Rosa
 The Telephone Operator (1954) - Lenchen Miesbach
 Clivia (1954)
 Don't Worry About Your Mother-in-Law (1954)
 Ten on Every Finger (1954) - Hans Albers' Sketchpartnerin
 An jedem Finger zehn (1954) - Singer
 The Spanish Fly (1955) - Jutta
 I Know What I'm Living For (1955) - Anna, Wirtschafterin bei Maria
 How Do I Become a Film Star? (1955)
 A Heart Full of Music (1955) - Fleurette
 Three Days Confined to Barracks (1955) - Auguste, die Köchin
 Love, Dance and a Thousand Songs (1955) - Wicky Winkler
 Music in the Blood (1955) - Irma Pehlke
 Charley's Aunt (1956) - Mona
 Die wilde Auguste (1956) - Auguste Schrull
 The Stolen Trousers (1956) - Grete Giesemann
 Ein tolles Hotel (1956) - Luise, seine Frau
 Das Liebesleben des schönen Franz (1956) - Emmi, Nichte des Portiers
 Du bist Musik (1956) - Sophie Klemke
 Musikparade (1956) - Trudchen
 Manöverball (1956) - Emma
 Saison in Oberbayern (1956) - Wanda Buzigl
 Die liebe Familie (1957) - Fräulein Briesnitz
 August der Halbstarke (1957) - Gitta Tamara, Chansonette
 Die Unschuld vom Lande (1957) - Else Meise
 Two Bavarians in the Jungle (1957) - Lilo Knopke
 Das Glück liegt auf der Straße (1957) - Studentin
 The Simple Girl (1957) - Milli
 The Daring Swimmer (1957) - Karin Biedermann
 The Legs of Dolores (1957) - Auguste Link, Chefin des "Pigalle"
 Greetings and Kisses from Tegernsee (1957) - Dorothea
 ...und abends in die Scala (1958) - Trudchen Putzke
 When She Starts, Look Out (1958) - Christa Knax
 The Star of Santa Clara (1958) - Mitzi
 A Song Goes Round the World (1958) - Malvine
 Here I Am, Here I Stay (1959) - Lucie
 Schlag auf Schlag (1959) - Gisela Sanders
 Peter Shoots Down the Bird (1959) - Mathilde Hütchen
 La Paloma (1959) - Fräulein Förster
 Of Course, the Motorists (1959) - Jutta Schmalbach
 Kauf dir einen bunten Luftballon (1961) - Mia
 Ach Egon! (1961) - Anna
 Bei Pichler stimmt die Kasse nicht (1961) - Isabella
 You Must Be Blonde on Capri (1961) - Lotte Jeschke
 Ein Stern fällt vom Himmel (1961) - Helga Held 11
 Isola Bella (1961) - Fräulein Finkenbusch
 Ramona (1961) - Ellinor
 Max the Pickpocket (1962) - Desiree
 The Turkish Cucumbers (1962) - Ruthlinde, beider Tochter
 The Sold Grandfather (1962) - Frl. Schülke, Sekretärin
 The Bird Seller (1962) - Kammerzofe Melanie
 Wild Water (1962) - Johanna
 Our Crazy Nieces (1963) - Felicitas
 Breakfast in Bed (1963) - Cilly
 Hochzeit am Neusiedler See (1963) - Isolde Tristan, Wanderbühnentalent
 Our Crazy Aunts in the South Seas (1964) - Felicitas
 The World Revolves Around You (1964) - Henriette Andreesen, Lilians Tante
 Come to the Blue Adriatic (1966) - Frl. Habicht
 The Sinful Village (1966) - Barbara Veit
 Spukschloß im Salzkammergut (1966)
 Rheinsberg (1967) - Anna
 Zur Hölle mit den Paukern (1968, part 1) - Dr. Pollhagen
 Pepe, der Paukerschreck (1969, part 3) - Studienrätin Dr. Pollhagen
 Helgalein (1969) - Frau Creutz
 Klein Erna auf dem Jungfernstieg (1969) - Frau Nohr
 Hurra, die Schule brennt! (1969, part 4) - Studienrätin Dr. Pollhagen
 We'll Take Care of the Teachers (1970, part 5) - Studienrätin Dr. Pollhagen
 What Is the Matter with Willi? (1970) - Annie Engel
 That Can't Shake Our Willi! (1970) - Sieglinde Hirsekorn
  (1971) - Marie
 Our Willi Is the Best (1971) - Heidelinde Hansen
 Kompanie der Knallköppe (1971) - Freifrau Agnes von Bülau
  (1972) - Josefa

References

External links
 

1925 births
1975 deaths
German film actresses
German stage actresses
Actresses from Hamburg
20th-century German actresses
Deaths from lung cancer in Germany
Burials at the Waldfriedhof Zehlendorf